A reader is a person who reads.  It may also refer to:

Computing and technology
 Adobe Reader (now Adobe Acrobat), a PDF reader
 Bible Reader for Palm, a discontinued PDA application
 A card reader, for extracting data from various forms of card-shaped media
 An e-reader, a device or software for viewing e-books
 Amazon Kindle
 Microsoft Reader
 Sony Reader
 Foxit Reader, a multilingual PDF tool
 Google Reader, a discontinued web app for handling RSS/Atom feeds
 K-NFB Reader, a handheld electronic reading device for the blind
 Lisp reader, the parser function in the Lisp programming language
 Microsoft Fingerprint Reader
 Newsreader (Usenet), for reading newsgroup posts
 Nintendo e-Reader, a device to read paper card media for the Game Boy Advance
 Reader, an off-line content viewing feature of Apple's Safari web browser
 Screen reader, a software application that attempts to identify and interpret what is being displayed on the screen

Education and literature
 Basal reader, a book used to teach reading and associated skills to schoolchildren
 McGuffey Readers, a well-known early series of such books
 Anthology, a book of selections of writing, usually by many authors
Uncle John's Bathroom Reader, a series of books containing trivia and short essays on miscellaneous topics
Reader-response criticism, a literary theory, primarily German and American
The Reader, a 1995 novel by Bernhard Schlink

Newspapers and magazines
Chicago Reader, a newsweekly
Duzhe, (translated Reader(s)), a Chinese magazine
High Plains Reader, an independent weekly tabloid
Los Angeles Reader, a defunct weekly paper
 The Reader (magazine), a literary quarterly published by the University of Liverpool
 San Diego Reader, a weekly newspaper in San Diego, California
Utne Reader, a periodical
Weekly Reader (formerly My Weekly Reader), an educational magazine for children
 The Reader (newspaper), a weekly in Omaha, Nebraska
Readers' Guide to Periodical Literature, a reference guide to articles in magazines and journals

Occupations
 A publisher's reader, also called a first reader
Reader (liturgy), a person charged with reading scripture in church
Reader (Christian Science Church) (also First Reader or Second Reader), a person who conducts services in a Christian Science church
Reader (Anglican Church)
Reader (academic rank), in British education the position between senior (or principal) lecturer and professor
 Reader (Inns of Court), a senior barrister of the Inns of Court in London elected to deliver lectures on a particular legal topic
Reader, a practitioner of cartomancy, fortune-telling using a deck of cards

Places
 Reader, Arkansas
 Reader Railroad, a tourist railroad
 Reader, Illinois
 Reader, West Virginia

Other uses
 The Reader (2008 film), based on the novel
Plate reader (or microplate reader), a laboratory instrument
"Readers", a slang term for reading glasses
Readers, a deck of marked cards

See also
Reader (surname)
Reeder (disambiguation)
The Reader (disambiguation)